István Vásáry (29 January 1887 – 25 August 1955) was a Hungarian politician, who served as Minister of Finance between 1944 and 1945 in the Interim National Government. He studied law in his birthplace. He was the mayor of Debrecen between 1928 and 1935. He became representative as member of the Smallholders Party in 1939. After 1945 he led the party's right-wing side. On 12 March 1946 he was excluded from the party onto the pressure of the Hungarian Communist Party. Vásáry retired from the politics in 1947.

References
 Magyar Életrajzi Lexikon
 Vásáry István /linksite.hu/

|-

1887 births
1955 deaths
People from Debrecen
Finance ministers of Hungary
Speakers of the National Assembly of Hungary
Mayors of Debrecen